Ksenia Milicevic (born September 15, 1942) is a French painter, architect and town planner. She is based in Paris, with a studio in Bateau-Lavoir in Montmartre and also maintains a base in South West France.

Life 
Ksenia Milicevic was born in 1942 in Drinici, Bosnia and Herzegovina. Her mother was born in Lackawanna, New York and her father in Montenegro. Both were partisans engaged in guerrilla campaigns during the Second World War. Following the Fourth anti-Partisan Offensive from January to April 1943 and the Fifth, May to June 1943, in south-eastern Bosnia and northern Montenegro, she was left with her grandparents in Montenegro. After the war, her parents joined the diplomatic service and she lived with them in Sofia and Prague.

Ksenia Milicevic discovered architecture, mosaics, frescoes and paintings in old monasteries. Her father, also a painter, gave her the gift of his oil-paints, resulting in her first oil painting at the age of fifteen. After studies in the V° Senior High School and one year in the University of Engineering in Belgrade, she moved to Algiers in 1962. There she studied architecture in the School of Architecture and Urbanism at the Institute of Urbanism. She graduated from both in 1968. In her spare time Milicevic joined the painting class of the painter M'hamed Issiakhem, in the School of Fine Arts, located in the same building. She worked for a year in ECOTEC with the team of the Brazilian architect Oscar Niemeyer. Interested in the Italian Renaissance, she traveled to Italy in 1965 to view the great Masters.

Milicevic moved to S.M. de Tucuman in the north of Argentina to work as an architect. Here she joined the art school of the National University and graduated in 1976. Her first exhibition took place in Tucuman in 1970.

She has also lived in Spain and Mexico and has settled in France since 1987. In 1989 she opened a workshop at Bateau-Lavoir in Montmartre. Her studio is next to that of Endre Rozsda. Since 1976 she has been exclusively dedicated to painting. She has held 120 individual and collective exhibitions throughout the world.

In 2011 the Museum of Painting of St. Frajou, Haute Garonne, France, was inaugurated with a selection of thirty paintings by Milicevic in the permanent collection. In 2012 Ksenia Milicevic created the International Children's Painting Biennial. In 2014 Ksenia Milicevic created the Art Resilience movement and in 2015 International Exhibition Art Resilience.
In May 2016 Ksenia Milicevic participates in the Euro-Mediterranean Congress - Marseilles: Resilience in the World of the Living, under the presidency of Boris Cyrulnik, 19–21 May 2016, Intervention on resilience in art.

Gallery

Selected exhibitions 

 2017  Forum artistique, Aurignac, Haute Garonne
 2016 Congrès Euro-Méditerranéen, Archives Départementales des Bouches du Rhône - Marseille - France
 2014 Eglise de Montesquieu. Montesquieu - France
 2011 Permanent Collection inauguration. Saint-Frajou Paintung Museum - France
 2005 Tribute to Alberto Magnelli. Mario Marini Museum Pistoia - Italy
 Etruscan Museum. Siena - Italy
 Consiglio Regionae. Firenze - Italy
 Museum of Cluj. Romania
 1998 Mexican Cultural Center. Brasília - Brazil.
 1997 Palais des Expositions. Geneva - Switzerland
 1995 Gallery 20 Fine Art. Paris - France.
 French Cultural Center. Oslo - Norway
 1986 Institut Français d'Amérique Latine. Mexico - Mexico

 1984 Palais des Congrès. Brussels - Belgium
 1983 Graphic Art Festival. Osaka - Japan
 18 French painters, Tamayo Contemporary Art Museum. Mexico - Mexico,
 1982 Gallery Misrachi. Mexico - Mexico
 1981 Museum of Contemporary Art. Madrid - Spain
 1980 18° International Exhibition Joan Miró. Barcelona - Spain
 1976 Theater of the eighth. Lyon - France
 1972 Gallery Lirolay. Buenos Aires - Argentina
 1970 University Gallery. Tucuman - Argentina

Museums 

 Fine Art Museum. Granada - Spain
 Museum de la Casa de los Tiros. Granada - Spain
 Museum of Contemporary Art. Salamanca - Spain
 Museo de Cuenca
 Museum of Art Actual. Ayllon - Spain
 Museum Municipal. Segobre - Spain
 Museum of Contemporary Art. Malabo - Guinea
 Museum Pinacoteca Municipal de Deifontes. Spain
 Museum of Armilla. Granada - Spain. Ficha n°7. Armilla. 20 de junio 1983. 
 Municipal Museum. Long - France
 Polytechnic Institute. Mexico - Mexico
 French Institute of Latin America. Mexico - Mexico
 Museum Zarsuela del Monte, Spain
 Museum Civico. Spilimbergo - Italy
 Foundation Paul Ricard. Paris - France
 Cultural Center of the Embassy of Mexico. Brasília - Brazil
 Paintings Museum of Saint-Frajou. Haute Garonne - France.

Books by Ksenia Milicevic 
 Ksenia Milicevic, Art-confusion.com - De l'image d'art à l'oeuvre d'art, éd. Edilivre, Paris, 2013
 Ksenia Milicevic, What art therapy for resilience ? Communications from the 4th World Congress on Resilience, p. 229
 Ksenia Milicevic, Résilience en art et art-thérapie pour la résilience, éd. Edilivre, Paris, 2020
 Ksenia Milicevic, Resilience, drawings, Amazon, 2021
 Ksenia Milicevic, Ange du jour - Jeu de divination, drawings, Amazon, 2021
 * Ksenia Milicevic, Collection Livres participatifs, Apprentissage du dessin 1. Randonnées sous les arbres, 2. Herbarium, 3. Maison au bord de la mer, 4. Lundi au marché, 5.  Maître Corbeau, autoédition, Amazon, 2022
 Ksenia Milicevic, Collection Résilience en Art : 1. Soulage, un trait noir sur la peinture, autoédition, Amazon, 2022, 2. Qui êtes-vous Mr. Duchamp ? autoédition, Amazon, 2022

Conferences 
Between November 2015 and  March 2016 Ksenia Milicevic gave a series of five lectures on Resilience in art, in the Painting Museum of Sain-Frajou, France : Resilience - a current concept, What is art ?, Beauty - subjective or objective ?, Contemporary art,  The responsibility of the artist.
Participation in the Euro-Mediterranean Conference - Marseille: Resilience in the World of the Alive, chaired by Boris Cyrulnik, 19–21 May 2016, Departmental Archives of Bouches du Rhône. Intervention on Resilience in art.
2017, lecture in the Paintung Museum of Saint-Frajou : "1917-2017 un siècle d'iconoclasme".
Between November 2017 and  March 2018 Ksenia Milicevic gave Cycle of four lectures on Images in painting : 1. What does the night tell us? , 2. Tales of light, 3. The murmur of water, 4. The voice of trees, in the Painting Museum of Sain-Frajou, France  
 March 2018 - Conference at Domaine des Tilleuls in Huos (Haute Garonne), France : Painting, 19th - 20th centuries: from the golden rule to the absence of rules
2018 - Participation in the 4° Resilience World Congress organized by Resilio - International Association for the Promotion and Dissemination of Resilience Research in partnership with the University Aix-Marseille in Marseille (France), from 27 to 30 June 2018. Intervention on Resilience in Art: What Art Therapy for Resilience?  
 2020 december - Design, applied art and plastic art in the age of resilience, The 6th International Conference of the Faculty of Applied Arts, Helwan University, Cairo, Egypt.
 2021 5° Congres on Resilience (Online), Sustainability factors and sustainability of art - Yaoundé, Camerun.

Further reading

 Espaces ambigus, by Christelle Larson.
 Haikou: Ksenia's paintings by James A. Emanuel.
 Illustration. Book Donde Sayago termina...Fermoselle by Luis Cortés Vazques. Salamanca 1980
 Illustration. Book Arpéges, Pratique des langues étrangères, 1990 
 Poem for Bakoua - Ksenia Milicevic's painting by Juan Carlos Plà.
 Naing Swann - Interview with Ksenia Milicevic. Mudita Magazine, Myanmar. September 2010.
 L'iconographie de l'Arbre sec au Moyen Age by Marlène Tchertalian-Delsouiller

References

External links 
Ksenia Milicevic - cerulean blue (in French)
Ksenia Milicevic in Saint-Frajou Painting Museum
Site Art Resilience

1942 births
French contemporary artists
French women painters
Bosnia and Herzegovina painters
Living people
Yugoslav emigrants to France
Bosnia and Herzegovina women artists
People of Montmartre
20th-century Bosnia and Herzegovina artists
21st-century Bosnia and Herzegovina artists
21st-century French women artists
20th-century French women